Carlos Palencia (born 22 August 1981) is a Mexican tennis player.

Palencia has a career high ATP singles ranking of 435 achieved on 22 May 2006. He also has a career high ATP doubles ranking of 269 achieved on 30 July 2007.

Palencia has 1 ATP Challenger Tour title at the 2007 Torneo Internacional Challenger León.

ATP Challenger and ITF Futures finals

Singles: 7 (3–4)

Doubles: 32 (15–17)

External links
 
 
 

1981 births
Living people
Mexican male tennis players
Central American and Caribbean Games medalists in tennis
Central American and Caribbean Games bronze medalists for Mexico